Lemez-Tamak (Lämäźtamaq) is a rural locality (a village) and the administrative centre of Lemez-Tamaksky Selsoviet, Mechetlinsky District, Bashkortostan, Russia. The population was 483 as of 2010. There are 5 streets.

Geography 
Lemez-Tamak is located 20 km south of Bolsheustyikinskoye (the district's administrative centre) by road. Kutushevo is the nearest rural locality.

References 

Rural localities in Mechetlinsky District